Piła Główna railway station (Polish for Piła main station) is the main railway station in Piła, in the Greater Poland Voivodeship, Poland. The station opened in 1851 and is located on the Kutno–Piła railway, Poznań–Piła railway, Tczew–Kostrzyn railway, Piła–Ustka railway, Piła–Ulikowo railway and Bzowo Goraj–Piła railway. The train services are operated by PKP and Przewozy Regionalne.

History
The station is one of the largest and most important railway junctions in northern Poland, located in the northwestern city of Piła. The complex is located in southern part of the centre of the city, at 1 Sigismund I the Old Street. Its construction began in 1853, when Pila belonged to the German Empire. The station was part of the newly built Prussian Eastern Railway, which opened in 1851 and reached Pila on 27 July 1851.

Construction of the complex was not completed until 1876, and in the subsequent years, many changes were introduced. Meanwhile, the importance of Piła as a junction grew, with construction of several other connections. In January 1871, a line to Złotów was opened, in May 1879, a line from Poznań to  Szczecinek via Piła, and in November 1881, a line to Wałcz was completed. Within 30 years, Piła became a nexus of great importance, and in 1913, the station served some 575,000 people.

Currently, the station has ten platforms. All the tracks are electrified, electrification work being completed in 1990. Over the tracks is a 230-metre-long road overpass, built in 1975.

On 19 May 1988, there was a train crash involving a military transport train of the Polish Army at the station in which 10 soldiers died and 28 were injured.

Modernisation
The station was rebuilt between May 2014 and October 2015. The modernised station was opened on 26 October 2015.

Train services
The station is served by the following services:

Intercity services Kolobrzeg - Pila - Bydgoszcz - Torun - Kutno - Lowicz - Warsaw
Intercity services Szczecin - Stargard - Krzyz - Pila - Bydgoszcz - Torun - Kutno - Lowicz - Warsaw - Lublin - Rzeszow - Przemysl
Intercity services Gorzow Wielkopolskie - Krzyz - Pila - Bydgoszcz - Torun - Kutno - Lowicz - Warsaw
Intercity services Kolobrzeg - Pila - Poznan - Wroclaw - Opole - Czestochowa - Krakow - Rzeszow - Zamosc/Przemysl
Intercity services Kolobrzeg - Pila - Poznan - Wroclaw - Opole - Bielsko-Biala
Intercity services Slupsk - Koszalin - Pila - Poznan - Wroclaw - Opole - Czestochowa - Krakow - Rzeszow - Przemysl
Intercity services Ustka - Slupsk - Koszalin - Pila - Poznan - Wroclaw - Opole - Katowice
Intercity services Szczecin - Stargard - Kalisz Pomorski - Pila - Bydgoszcz
Intercity services (TLK) Gdynia Główna — Kostrzyn 
Regional services (R) Piła- Bydgoszcz
Regional services (R) Szczecin - Stargard - Kalisz Pomorski - Pila
Regional services (R) Krzyz - Pila - Chojnice
Regional services (R) Szczecinek - Piła Główna - Poznań Główny

Coach station
Near the station, close to the northern entrance, is a bus station of Przedsiebiorstwo Komunikacji Samochodowej.

See also 
 OKRAGLAK Roundhouse in Piła

References
Piła Główna article at Polish Stations Database, URL accessed at 1 October 2010

 This article is based upon a translation of the Polish language version as of July 2016.

External links 
 A photo of the station
 History of rail in Pila

Railway stations in Poland opened in 1851
Railway stations in Greater Poland Voivodeship
Piła County
Railway stations served by Przewozy Regionalne InterRegio
1851 establishments in Prussia
19th-century establishments in the Province of Posen